Somersault is the second album by Swedish indie pop band Eggstone, first released in Sweden in March 1994. A US release appeared later that year on BMG label Critique Records. The song "The Dog" was issued as a promotional single and became a hit on various college radio stations. The album was re-issued on vinyl in 1997 by Vibrafon Records, and again by Crunchy Frog Records in 2017.

Track listing
 All songs written by Eggstone, except "Luck" written by Eggstone/Blair.

 "Against the Sun" – 2:41
 "It's Not the Rain" – 3:19
 "Hang On to Your Eco" – 2:45
 "Good Morning" – 3:38
 "Desdemona" – 3:03
 "The Dog" – 3:42
 "Water" – 3:09
 "Luck" – 3:50
 "Cornflake Crown" – 3:15
 "Split" – 2:41
 "Happiest Fool" – 3:24

Personnel
Patrik Bartosch – Guitar, Backing vocals, Keyboards, Vibraphone, Glockenspiel
Maurits Carlsson – Drums, Percussion, Backing vocals
Per Sunding – Lead vocals, Bass
 Gunilla Markström – Violin on "Good Morning", "Luck", "Happiest Fool"
 Leila Forstén – Violin on "Good Morning", "Luck", "Happiest Fool"
 Nikola Zidarov – Viola on "Good Morning", "Luck", "Happiest Fool"
 James SK Wān – Bamboo Flute on "Good Morning"

References

External links
Eggstone web site: detailed 'Somersault' information

Eggstone albums
1994 albums